List of MPs elected in the United Kingdom general election, 1806

This is a list of the MPs or Members of Parliament elected to the House of Commons for the constituencies of the Parliament of the United Kingdom in the 1806 United Kingdom general election, the 3rd Parliament of the United Kingdom after the Union with Ireland. The 1806 general election ran from 29 October to 2 December. There were contests in 87 of the 380 constituencies.  The parliamentary session ran from 15 December 1806 to 27 April 1807, lasting 138 days.



By-elections 
List of United Kingdom by-elections (1801–06)

See also
List of parliaments of the United Kingdom
Members of the 3rd UK Parliament from Ireland
Unreformed House of Commons

References

1812
1806 in the United Kingdom
1806